The Waltz in E minor is a waltz for solo piano by Frédéric Chopin. It was composed circa 1830 and published in May 1851.

It was the first of Chopin's posthumously published waltzes not to be given an opus number. It appears in Brown's catalogue as B. 56, in Kobylańska's catalogue as KK IVa/15, in Chomiński's as P1/15, and in the Chopin National Edition as WN 29. It was composed shortly before Chopin left Poland at the age of 20. Although this is the final (fourteenth) waltz in the older editions of Chopin (other waltzes being included in more recent editions), it is believed to have been composed before any of the waltzes published in Chopin's lifetime.

In a typical performance, this waltz lasts just under three minutes.

In 1956, Jerome Robbins choreographed his ballet The Concert (or, The Perils of Everybody) which uses, among other works by Chopin, the Waltz in E minor for the portion known as the "Mistake Waltz".

Structure 
This E minor waltz is in a modified rondo form as "Introduction–A–B–A–B–A–C–A'–coda". The "C" is in E major with temporary modulations to G-sharp minor.

References

External links 
 
 , Iskra Mantcheva
 

Waltzes by Frédéric Chopin
1830 compositions
Compositions in E minor
Compositions by Frédéric Chopin published posthumously